The 1909–10 Football League season was Birmingham Football Club's 18th in the Football League and their 10th in the Second Division. They finished bottom of the 20-team division, three points adrift of safety, so had to apply for re-election to the league for the 1910–11 season. They led the voting, ahead of Huddersfield Town who were elected to the league to replace Grimsby Town, who had finished the season in 19th place, above Birmingham. Alex Watson stepped down as secretary-manager at the end of the season, to be succeeded by Bob McRoberts, who had played as a forward for the club for seven years, and who became their first full-time manager, with no secretarial duties. They also took part in the 1909–10 FA Cup, entering at the first round proper and losing in that round to Leicester Fosse.

Twenty-six players made at least one appearance in nationally organised first-team competition, and there were ten different goalscorers. Forward Charlie Millington played in 36 of the 39 matches over the season, and half-back Albert Gardner appeared in one fewer. Walter Freeman was leading scorer with 10 goals, all of which came in the league.

Football League Second Division

League table (part)

FA Cup

Appearances and goals

Players with name struck through and marked  left the club during the playing season.

See also
Birmingham City F.C. seasons

References
General
 Matthews, Tony (1995). Birmingham City: A Complete Record. Breedon Books (Derby). .
 Matthews, Tony (2010). Birmingham City: The Complete Record. DB Publishing (Derby). .
 Source for match dates and results: "Birmingham City 1909–1910: Results". Statto Organisation. Retrieved 21 May 2012.
 Source for lineups, appearances, goalscorers and attendances: Matthews (2010), Complete Record, pp. 264–65. Note that attendance figures are estimated.
 Source for kit: "Birmingham City". Historical Football Kits. Retrieved 22 May 2018.

Specific

Birmingham City F.C. seasons
Birmingham